The following outline is provided as an overview of and topical guide to the Cook Islands:

Cook Islands – self-governing parliamentary democracy in free association with New Zealand.  The fifteen small islands in this South Pacific Ocean country have a total land area of 240 square kilometres (92.7 sq mi), but the Cook Islands Exclusive Economic Zone (EEZ) covers 1.8 million square kilometres (0.7 million sq mi) of ocean. The main population centres are on the island of Rarotonga (c.10,000), where there is an international airport. Defence is the responsibility of New Zealand, in consultation with the Cook Islands and at its request. In recent times, the Cook Islands have adopted an increasingly independent foreign policy.

General reference

 Pronunciation:
 Common English country name: The Cook Islands
 Official English country name: The Cook Islands
 Common endonym(s): Kūki 'Āirani
 Official endonym(s): Kūki 'Āirani
 Adjectival(s): Cook Island
 Demonym(s): Cook Islander
 Etymology: Name of the Cook Islands
 ISO country codes: CK, COK, 184
 ISO region codes: See ISO 3166-2:CK
 Internet country code top-level domain: .ck

Geography of the Cook Islands 

Geography of the Cook Islands
 The Cook Islands are: a territory of New Zealand
 Location:
 Southern Hemisphere and Eastern Hemisphere
 Pacific Ocean
 South Pacific Ocean
 Oceania
 Polynesia
 Time zone:  UTC-10
 Extreme points of the Cook Islands
 High:  Te Manga 
 Low:  South Pacific Ocean 0 m
 Land boundaries:  none
 Coastline:  120 km
 Population of the Cook Islands: 17,459 – 223rd most populous country
 Area of the Cook Islands: 
 Atlas of the Cook Islands

Environment of the Cook Islands 

 Climate of the Cook Islands
 Renewable energy in the Cook Islands
 Geology of the Cook Islands
 Protected areas of the Cook Islands
 Biosphere reserves in the Cook Islands
 National parks of the Cook Islands
 Wildlife of the Cook Islands
 Fauna of the Cook Islands
 Birds of the Cook Islands
 Mammals of the Cook Islands

Natural geographic features of the Cook Islands 

 Islands of the Cook Islands
 Northern chain
 Southern chain
 Lakes of the Cook Islands
 Mountains of the Cook Islands
 Volcanoes in the Cook Islands
 Rivers of the Cook Islands
 Waterfalls of the Cook Islands
 Valleys of the Cook Islands
 World Heritage Sites in the Cook Islands: None

Regions of the Cook Islands 

Regions of the Cook Islands

Ecoregions of the Cook Islands 

List of ecoregions in the Cook Islands

Administrative divisions of the Cook Islands 
None

Municipalities of the Cook Islands 

 Capital of the Cook Islands: Avarua
 Cities of the Cook Islands

Demography of the Cook Islands 

Demographics of the Cook Islands

Government and politics of the Cook Islands 

Politics of the Cook Islands
 Form of government: parliamentary representative democracy within a constitutional monarchy
 Capital of the Cook Islands: Avarua
 Elections in the Cook Islands
 Political parties in the Cook Islands

Branches of the government of the Cook Islands 

Government of the Cook Islands

Executive branch of the government of the Cook Islands 
 Head of state: Charles III
 Head of government: Prime Minister of the Cook Islands
 Cabinet of the Cook Islands

Legislative branch of the government of the Cook Islands 

 Parliament of the Cook Islands 
 House of Ariki (Advisory Body)

Judicial branch of the government of the Cook Islands 

Judiciary of the Cook Islands
 Cook Islands Court of Appeal
 High Court of the Cook Islands
 Chief Justice of the Cook Islands

Foreign relations of the Cook Islands 

Foreign relations of the Cook Islands
 Diplomatic missions in the Cook Islands
 Diplomatic missions of the Cook Islands

International organization membership 
The government of the Cook Islands is a member of:

African, Caribbean, and Pacific Group of States (ACP)
Asian Development Bank (ADB)
Food and Agriculture Organization (FAO)
International Civil Aviation Organization (ICAO)
International Criminal Court (ICCt)
International Federation of Red Cross and Red Crescent Societies (IFRCS)
International Fund for Agricultural Development (IFAD)
International Mobile Satellite Organization (IMSO)
International Olympic Committee (IOC)
International Red Cross and Red Crescent Movement (ICRM)

International Trade Union Confederation (ITUC)
Organisation for the Prohibition of Chemical Weapons (OPCW)
Pacific Islands Forum (PIF)
Secretariat of the Pacific Community (SPC)
South Pacific Regional Trade and Economic Cooperation Agreement (Sparteca)
United Nations Educational, Scientific, and Cultural Organization (UNESCO)
Universal Postal Union (UPU)
World Health Organization (WHO)
World Meteorological Organization (WMO)

Law and order in the Cook Islands 

Law of the Cook Islands
 Capital punishment in the Cook Islands
 Constitution of the Cook Islands
 Crime in the Cook Islands
 Human rights in the Cook Islands
 LGBT rights in the Cook Islands
 Freedom of religion in the Cook Islands
 Law enforcement in the Cook Islands

Military of the Cook Islands 

Military of the Cook Islands

Local government in the Cook Islands 

Local government in the Cook Islands

History of the Cook Islands 

History of the Cook Islands
 Timeline of the history of the Cook Islands
 Current events of the Cook Islands
 Military history of the Cook Islands

Culture of the Cook Islands 

Culture of the Cook Islands
 Architecture of the Cook Islands
 Cuisine of the Cook Islands
 Festivals in the Cook Islands
 Languages of the Cook Islands
 Media in the Cook Islands
 National symbols of the Cook Islands
 Coat of arms of the Cook Islands
 Flag of the Cook Islands
 National anthem of the Cook Islands
 People of the Cook Islands
 Public holidays in the Cook Islands
 Records of the Cook Islands
 Religion in the Cook Islands
 Christianity in the Cook Islands
 Hinduism in the Cook Islands
 Islam in the Cook Islands
 Judaism in the Cook Islands
 Sikhism in the Cook Islands
 World Heritage Sites in the Cook Islands: None

Art in the Cook Islands 
 Art in the Cook Islands
 Cinema of the Cook Islands
 Literature of the Cook Islands
 Music of the Cook Islands
 Television in the Cook Islands
 Theatre in the Cook Islands

Sports in the Cook Islands 

Sports in the Cook Islands
 Rugby league in the Cook Islands
 Rugby union in the Cook Islands
 Football in the Cook Islands
 Cook Islands at the Olympics

Economy and infrastructure of the Cook Islands 

Economy of the Cook Islands
 Economic rank, by nominal GDP (2007): 185th (one hundred and eighty fifth)
 Agriculture in the Cook Islands
 Banking in the Cook Islands
 National Bank of the Cook Islands
 Telecommunications in the Cook Islands
 Companies of the Cook Islands
Currency of the Cook Islands: Cook Islands dollar/New Zealand dollar
ISO 4217: NZD
 Energy in the Cook Islands
 Renewable energy in the Cook Islands
 Energy policy of the Cook Islands
 Oil industry in the Cook Islands
 Mining in the Cook Islands
 Tourism in the Cook Islands
 Transport in the Cook Islands
 the Cook Islands Stock Exchange

Education in the Cook Islands 

Education in the Cook Islands
Nukutere College

Infrastructure of the Cook Islands
 Health care in the Cook Islands
 Transportation in the Cook Islands
 Airports in the Cook Islands
 Rail transport in the Cook Islands
 Roads in the Cook Islands
 Water supply and sanitation in the Cook Islands

See also 

Cook Islands
Cook Islands Maori language
Index of Cook Islands–related articles
List of Cook Islands-related topics
List of international rankings
Outline of geography
Outline of New Zealand
Outline of Oceania

References

External links

Cook Islands Government
Cook Islands Government (summary)

Comprehensive Cook Islands site with news section
Detailed and non-commercial website
Cook Islands National Environment Service
Cook Islands Biodiversity Database
Photographs of CI banknotes including unique 3 dollar bill

Cook Islands
Cook Islands
Cook Islands